Gladkov is a Russian surname, and may refer to:
 Fyodor Gladkov, socialist writer
 Grigory Gladkov, Soviet and Russian bard and composer. 
 Gennady Gladkov, Soviet and Russian composer
 Nikolai Alekseievich Gladkov, Russian ornithologist
 Yury Gladkov, St. Petersburg politician

Russian-language surnames